Hook  is a small town and civil parish in the Hart District of northern Hampshire, England.

London is 41 miles (66 km) northeast of the village.

In 2019, Hook had an estimated population of 8,208. Hook railway station has direct rail links to both London Waterloo and Basingstoke with indirect routes to Reading, Salisbury, and Southampton. Rail services are provided by South Western Railway.

Among the businesses located in Hook are Serco and Trimble Navigation. Between 2004 and 2006, Hook expanded eastwards with the development of the Holt Park residential district, and from 2020 northeastwards with the Green Hart Park and Oakwood Grange developments.

History 
Until the 18th century, only a few scattered farms could be found in the area; small hamlets did not begin to appear until inns sprung up to serve travellers. Hook was located on the main London to Exeter stagecoach route. In the late eighteenth century, a turnpike road was constructed to aid the navigation of the steep Scures Hill, to the west of the village. In 1883, Hook railway station was constructed, and the village began to grow with railway workers and commuters settling in Hook.

Early-Mid 20th century 
St John the Evangelist Parish Church was completed in 1938, replacing the tin tabernacle used by worshippers since 1886. The new Church was designed by Edward Maufe and shows in small scale design features that would later be incorporated by him into Guildford Cathedral. Even the Cathedral fund raising scheme of "buying a brick" was first utilised at Hook, where the Church retains an impressive list of donors and benefactors. Hook also has a Roman Catholic church and an Evangelical Church. The latter now known as Life Church was originally paid for by the family who founded Burberry; founder Thomas Burberry being a Baptist who died in Hook. The present Life Church Centre was opened in 2011.

Hook being a hamlet in the village of Odiham before 1955; the distinct Anglican ecclesiastical parish of Hook was not created before then. It was only in 1943 that permission was given for burials in Hook itself.

Post World War II History 
Hook was considered as part of a scheme to settle Londoners in the country after the Second World War, but nearby Basingstoke was selected for development instead. Recently, the village has grown in size considerably, with new housing developments being constructed.

Although within  of the far larger town of Basingstoke to the west, Hook's development since the 1980s has been rapid. Calls have been made to redevelop the 'village' centre as Hook has few amenities for its size, as it is now generally considered as a town in terms of its population and urban expanse.

Affluence is high due to surrounding rural areas, estates, such as Tylney Hall Park and Garden, which is Grade II* listed, and Hook Common, a large mixture of forest and heathland, coupled with excellent transport links.

Transport 
Hook has one of the few national TaxiBus services.

There is the main line rail station mentioned above and direct access to the M3 motorway, as well as the A30 connecting local towns such as Basingstoke and Yateley. Many residents commute to the larger local towns of Basingstoke, Winchester, Reading, Camberley, Fleet and Farnborough, with some travelling further afield to Southampton, Bracknell and London.

Education 
In Hook, there are a number of local schools. They are:
 Hook Infant School
 Hook Junior School
 Robert May's School (in neighbouring Odiham)
 Nearest further/higher education college – Basingstoke College of Technology Queen Mary's College Farnborough Sixth Form College
 Nearest university – University of Winchester / Farnborough College of Technology which offers courses at a university level through University Centre Farnborough.

The Hook Schools are supported by the Hook Schools Community Association (HSCA) and local donors

Village Events 
There are several annual and monthly community events held in the village:
 The Hook Fun Run & Road Race attracts over 1,200 runners on the third Sunday in May every year. It is run by a group of volunteers and raises funds for local good causes, having distributed over £100,000 since its inception in 1992.
 Hook Flower and Produce Show - September each year - free to enter and free for visitors 
 Hook Books at The Elizabeth Hall monthly community pop-up Library 
 Hook Summer Fair - July each year
 HSCA Fireworks Display Hook Junior School
 HSCA Christmas Fair Hook Junior School
 Hook Cracker on the first Saturday in December, hosted by St John the Evangelist Church
 Hook Beer Festival - May each year
Off The Hook Fest

Village Magazine 
Hook Focus is Hook's authoritative magazine and, since 1973, it has carried news of future Community Events and reports on all that has been happening in Hook. Focus is managed by Hook volunteers and is independent of all other bodies.

Gallery

References

External links 

 Hook Fun Run & Road Race
 Hook Parish Council
 Life Church
 Sacred Heart Catholic Church
 St John's Church

Hook